Sir John Gilbert McLaren,  (15 October 1871 – 27 July 1958) was a senior Australian public servant. He was a commissioner of the Public Service Board, Secretary of the Prime Minister's Department and served an appointment as official secretary, High Commissioner's Office in London.

Life and career
John McLaren was born in Parramatta, New South Wales, on 15 October 1871. He was educated at Sydney Boys High School.

In 1901, McLaren joined the Commonwealth Public Service in the Postmaster-General's Department.

Between 1921 and June 1928, McLaren was Secretary of the Department of Home and Territories.

In June 1928, McLaren was promoted to the Public Service Board as second member. He departed his Board position in December 1928, to take on the role of Secretary of the Prime Minister's Department.

McLaren died in Strathfield, New South Wales, on 27 July 1958.

Awards
McLaren was appointed a Companion of the Order of St Michael and St George in 1925, and made a Knight Bachelor in June 1935 while Secretary of the London High Commission.

References

1871 births
1958 deaths
Australian public servants
Australian Companions of the Order of St Michael and St George
Australian Knights Bachelor
People educated at Sydney Boys High School